Šmatevž is a small village in the Municipality of Braslovče in Slovenia. The area is part of the traditional region of Lower Styria. The municipality is now included in the Savinja Statistical Region.

Name
The name of the settlement was changed from Sveti Matevž (literally, 'Saint Matthew') to Šmatevž in 1955. The name was changed on the basis of the 1948 Law on Names of Settlements and Designations of Squares, Streets, and Buildings as part of efforts by Slovenia's postwar communist government to remove religious elements from toponyms.

Church
The local church, from which the settlement gets its name, is dedicated to Saint Matthew and belongs to the Parish of Gomilsko. It was originally a Gothic building. The belfry dates to the 16th century. It was extended and restyled in the 17th and 19th centuries.

References

External links
Šmatevž on Geopedia

Populated places in the Municipality of Braslovče